Stamford University Bangladesh  is a private university in Dhaka, Bangladesh. It was established in 2002 under the Private University Act. Before starting as a university, its predecessor institution was known as a Stamford College Group established in 1994, later it was upgraded as private university of Bangladesh in 2002 and appeared as Stamford University Bangladesh. Stamford University is the first ISO certified university in Bangladesh. Stamford University Bangladesh is fully approved by UGC.

University and Campus
Stamford University Bangladesh has only one campus in Siddeshwari (Bailey Road) area of Dhaka city. The campus comprises all of the departments and offices.

The campus is one of the largest private university  with outdoor basketball ground, a swimming pool, café, and in-campus shop facilities.

Departments 

 Department of Architecture 
 Department of Business Administration 
 Department of Civil Engineering 
 Department of Computer Science 
 Department of Economics 
 Department of Electrical and Electronic Engineering 
 Department of English 
 Department of Environmental Science 
 Department of Film and Media 
 Department of Journalism Media Studies 
 Department of Law 
 Department of Microbiology 
 Department of Pharmacy 
 Department of Public Administration

Subjects and Courses

Undergraduate programs 

 Bachelor of Science in Microbiology
 Bachelor of Pharmacy
 Bachelor of Laws (LL.B)
 Bachelor of Arts in Film & Media
 Bachelor of Public Administration
 Bachelor of Architecture
 Bachelor of Business Administration
 Bachelor of Science in Civil Engineering
 Bachelor of Arts with Honors in English
 Bachelor of Social Science in Economics
 Bachelor of Science in Environmental Science
 Bachelor of Science in Computer Science & Engineering
 Bachelor of Science in Electrical & Electronic Engineering
 Bachelor of Social Science in Journalism for Electronic & Print Media

Graduate programs 

 Master of Social Science in Journalism & Media Studies
 Master of Science in Computer Science & Engineering
 Master of Arts in Film & Media (Preliminary & Final)
 Master of Science in Environmental Science
 Master of Social Science in Economics
 Master of Arts in Film & Media (Final)
 Master of Science in Microbiology
 Master of Business Administration
 Master In Computer Application
 Master of Arts in English (Final)
 Master of Public Administration
 Master of Laws (LL.M)
 Master of Pharmacy

Short course 

 Japanese Language Course

Centers

 Career Counseling and Placement Centre (CCPC).
 Stamford Institute on Addiction and Rehabilitation (SIAR).
 Centre for Professional Development in Business (CPDB).
 Stamford University Research Centre (SURC).
 Japanese Language Centre (JLC).
 International Centre for Development and Research (ICDR).
 Centre for South Asian Policy Research (CSAPR).
 Centre for Continuing Education, Consulting, and Research (CCR).

There are multiple clubs and students branches in SUB. It is ensured that the students are always participating and thus actively learning about multiple sectors; the following is the list of clubs in SUB: 
1. SDF, Stamford University Debate Forum 
2. YES, Youth Engagement and Support 
3. SUVs, Stamford University Volunteers 
4. Straybird 
5. Stamford University Shahittya Forum 
6. SUDs, Stamford University Drama Society 
7. SPF, Stamford Pharma Forum
8. Stamford University Computer Society 
9. Stamford University Math Circle

Credit transfer
Stamford university provide credit transfer facility for its students to different reputed foreign universities. The university has already transferred more than 100 students of BBA, MBA, CSE and CSI programs to different universities of the US, the UK, Canada and Australia. It has arranged joint degree programs and credit transfer programs with Claflin University, State University of New York and Monash University, Australia.

See also
 Stamford International University (Thailand)

Footnotes

External links

 Official website
 Stamford Debate Forum

 
Private universities in Bangladesh
Educational institutions established in 1994
Architecture in Bangladesh
Architecture schools in Bangladesh
Universities and colleges in Dhaka
1994 establishments in Bangladesh